Notable individuals who have expressed reservations about nuclear power, nuclear weapons, and/or uranium mining in the US include the following. 

Steve Allen
Edward Asner
Alex Baldwin
Thomas Banyacya 
Albert Bates
Norma Becker
Shelley Berkley
Daniel Berrigan
Philip Berrigan
Rosalie Bertell
Bill Bichsel
Larry Bogart
Peter A. Bradford
Michael F. Brennan
Dale Bridenbaugh
Pierce Brosnan
David Brower
Jackson Browne
Helen Caldicott
Paxus Calta
Paul K. Chappell
Robert Cherwink
Remy Chevallier
Guy Chichester
Tom Clements
William Sloane Coffin
Barry Commoner
Norman Cousins
Frances Crowe
Matt Damon
Carrie Barefoot Dickerson
Ralph DiGia
Paul M. Doty
Michael Douglas
Eric Epstein
Samuel Epstein
Cindy Folkers
Jane Fonda
Randall Forsberg
Morgan Freeman
S. David Freeman
Carole Gallagher
Noel Gayler
Carol Gilbert
John Gofman
Whoopi Goldberg
Jay M. Gould
Karl Grossman
Ed Grothus
Arnold Gundersen
Paul Gunter
John Hall
Libbey HaLevy
Corbin Harney
Howie Hawkins
Carl Hocevar
Richard Hubbard
Jackie Hudson
Robert Hunter (journalist)
Cathy Iwane
John Isaacs
Mark Z. Jacobson
Carl J. Johnson
Judy Johnsrud
Kevin Kamps
Henry Kissinger 
David Krieger
Hans M. Kristensen
Dennis Kucinich
Eve Andree Laramee
Michael Leonardi
Mary Dennis Lentch
Sally Lilienthal
Mali Lightfoot
Sam Lovejoy
Rachel MacNair
Joanna Macy
Arjun Makhijani
Thomas Mancuso
Lenore Marshall
Norman Mayer
Gary Milhollin
Gregory Minor
Roger Molander
Carl Z. Morgan
Howard Morland
Macy Morse
Hermann Joseph Muller
Ralph Nader
Graham Nash
Holly Near
Robert De Niro
Sam Nunn
Grace Paley
Marius Paul
Manuel Pino
William Perry
John Aristotle Phillips
Concepcion Picciotto
Esther Posneck
Eugene Rabinowitch
Phil Radford
Bonnie Raitt
M.V. Ramana
Ray Masala
Donna Reed
Megan Rice
Jose Rodriguez (activist)
Joseph J. Romm
Robert Ryan
Susan Sarandon
Jonathan Schell
Gary and Jean Shaw
George Shultz 
Martin Sheen
Peter Shumlin
Karen Silkwood
Mary P. Sinclair
Alice Slater
Pam Solo
Norman Solomon
Richard Springer
Priscilla Star
Ernest Sternglass
Gene Stone
Arthur R. Tamplin
Thomas
Ellen Thomas
Louie Vitale
Christoph Waltz
Harvey Wasserman
Floyd Red Crow Westerman
Ann Wright
Bennie Zable

See also

Anti-nuclear protests in the United States
Anti-nuclear groups in the United States
List of peace activists
List of anti-nuclear advocates in Germany 
List of people associated with renewable energy
List of pro-nuclear (power) environmentalists

References

Advocates
United States environment-related lists